Bartholin Peak is a conspicuous peak near the north end of the Boyle Mountains in Graham Land. It was named by the UK Antarctic Place-Names Committee in 1958 for Erasmus Bartholin, of Copenhagen, whose De Figura Nivis Dissertatio, 1661, includes the earliest known scientific description of snow crystals.

References
 

Mountains of Graham Land
Loubet Coast